"You Win or You Die" is the seventh episode of the first season of the HBO medieval fantasy television series Game of Thrones. It was written by series creators David Benioff and D. B. Weiss, and directed by Daniel Minahan. It first aired on May 29, 2011, and was released in advance immediately following the conclusion of "A Golden Crown" to HBO customers with access to HBO Go.

The episode furthers the story line of deterioration of the political balance of the Seven Kingdoms, with Eddard Stark revealing what he has discovered to Cersei Lannister while King Robert is still away on a hunt. The title of the episode is part of a quote from Cersei Lannister during the final confrontation with Eddard: "When you play the game of thrones, you win or you die. There is no middle ground." The catchphrase has been frequently used during the promotion of both the books and the television series.

The episode was generally well received by critics for its well-acted dramatic tension, but with several criticizing the coupling of exposition and nudity as "sexposition". In the United States, the episode achieved a viewership of 2.4 million in its initial broadcast.

Plot

In the Westerlands
Lord Tywin gives half his forces to his son Jaime to attack Riverrun, seat of House Tully and Lady Catelyn's childhood home, believing war with the Starks will allow the Lannisters to rule the Seven Kingdoms.

At Winterfell
Osha, now a servant of Winterfell, reveals that she and her fellow wildlings were fleeing the White Walkers.

At the Wall
Benjen's horse returns from north of the Wall without him. Sam believes Jon, assigned as a steward to the Lord Commander instead of a ranger, is being groomed for command. As Jon and Sam take their vows near a heart tree, Jon's direwolf Ghost brings him a dismembered hand.

In Vaes Dothrak
Daenerys fails to convince Khal Drogo to invade her homeland. Ser Jorah receives a royal pardon and realizes Daenerys’ assassination has been ordered. He saves her from an attempted poisoning, and Drogo vows to lead his people to reclaim the Iron Throne for his unborn son.

In King's Landing
Ned confronts Queen Cersei with the knowledge that her children were incestuously fathered by her brother Jaime. Cersei defends her affair and reveals Robert was still in love with Ned's deceased sister, Lyanna. Ned tells Cersei to leave the capital with her children before he tells Robert the truth.

Mortally wounded by a boar, Robert dictates his will and testament to Ned, naming him regent until Joffrey comes of age; instead of "Joffrey," Ned writes "my rightful heir." Robert begs Ned to make Joffrey a better man, and tells him to let Daenerys live.

Renly tries to convince Ned to launch a coup d'état against the Lannisters, but Ned refuses and dispatches a letter to rightful heir Stannis Baratheon. Ned reveals Joffrey's heritage to Littlefinger, who suggests that if Joffrey proves an unfit ruler, they use the truth to make Renly king instead. Ned refuses, asking Littlefinger to secure the City Watch's support against Cersei's men-at-arms.

By the time Robert dies, Renly has fled and Joffrey has ordered his own coronation. Ned and his allies present Robert's will to the court, but Cersei tears it up and orders Ser Barristan Selmy to seize Ned, who orders his men to arrest Cersei and Joffrey. Instead, the City Watch slaughters the Stark men as Littlefinger holds Ned at knifepoint, telling him "I did warn you not to trust me."

Production

Writing

The episode was written by the showrunners David Benioff and D. B. Weiss, based on the original novel by George R. R. Martin. The chapters included in "You Win or You Die" are 46, 48-50, and 55 (Eddard XII, Eddard XIII, Jon VI, Eddard XIV, and Daenerys VI), making it the episode that includes fewest chapters of the source novel in the entire first season. Among the scenes created specifically for the show were a meeting between Tywin and Jaime Lannister (as Lord Tywin is field dressing a stag) and a "training" session between Littlefinger and two new female recruits for one of his brothels.

Casting
"You Win or You Die" marks the first appearance of Charles Dance as Lord Tywin, the patriarch of the Lannister household. Cast in the role shortly after the production began, Dance had been the first choice of the producers and one of the fan favorites for the role. Author George R. R. Martin commented that "his commanding screen presence and steely charisma should make him the perfect Lord Tywin." The deer that is field dressed by Tywin in the opening scene was a real dead stag. Dance had no previous experience with skinning and gutting, and before filming the scene practiced for an hour with a butcher.

Filming locations
Most of the episode was shot on set at the Northern Irish studios of The Paint Hall. The exteriors of the entrance of Vaes Dothrak were filmed in the Sandy Brae area, and for the confrontation between Eddard and Cersei taking place in the Red Keep's gardens (identified as a godswood in the novels) the production used the cloister of the St Dominic Monastery in Rabat, in Malta.

Reception

Ratings
"You Win or You Die"'s first airing was seen by 2.4 million viewers, stabilizing the show's ratings. This could be considered positive when taking into account that the episode had been offered in advance during the preceding week in HBO's online service, and that it was aired in a three-day holiday weekend which often results in lower viewership. With the second airing, the total audience for the night was 3.2 million viewers.

Critical response
The episode was well received by critics. Review aggregator Rotten Tomatoes surveyed 20 reviews of the episode and judged 100% of them to be positive with an average score of 9.02 out of 10. The website's critical consensus reads, "The cinematic, fast-paced "You Win or You Die" thrusts the plot forward while hinting at painful moments looming for fans." Times reviewer James Poniewozik called "You Win or You Die" the "most thrilling and thematically rich hour to date," AOL TV's Maureen Ryan found it an excellent outing that "saw the stakes raised in satisfying and suspenseful ways," and HitFix's Alan Sepinwall called it a terrific episode and commended how "it turned the spotlight on the characters who are villains in Ned Stark's version of the story."

Poniewozik continued: "We knew this would be a significant episode if for no other reason than that it contains the scene—alluded to in the episode's title—that gives the series its name," a sentiment Sepinwall agreed with. Myles McNutt, writing for Cultural Learnings, also considered "You Win or You Die" a climactic moment in the series. IGNs Matt Fowler noted that this was the episode that saw Ned Stark "unfortunately thwarted by his own honorable intentions," but that his "stubborn nobility is what makes Ned such a great character."

The final showdown with the Lannisters seizing control from Eddard was much discussed, with many commentators criticizing Ned's ingenuity and his actions during the episode. In The Atlantic, Scott Meslow wrote that Eddard could never win the "game of thrones" because he is dedicated to playing by the rules. In his opinion, "one can't afford to play fair" when the only outcomes are "win" or "die." McNutt felt that the climax at the episode's end "was really well handled by both the cast and the director (Dan Minahan)."

As well as the final confrontation between Eddard and Cersei, other scenes were praised by the critics. The introduction of Charles Dance as Lord Tywin Lannister was considered "a beauty" by Emily VanDerWerff from the A.V. Club, who admired how a single scene depicted not only the relationship between Tywin and Jaime, but also all the dynamics of the Lannister clan. She also praised the work of Nikolaj Coster-Waldau in the scene, commenting that despite having few lines, he transmitted that Jaime is cowed by his father very well. Maureen Ryan agreed with that sentiment, and also lauded Natalia Tena's short appearance. David Sims (a second reviewer for the A.V. Club) highlighted the work of Mark Addy in his final scene, extending the praise to the rest of his work on the series.

Critics agreed that the scenes with the Dothraki were strong, with the storyline having improved significantly since the first episodes. Poniewozik stated that "this was the first week for me that the Dothraki scenes were not just absorbing but felt like the characters were as well-imagined as those in Westeros," and McNutt felt the episode "finally allows Khal Drogo to become an actual character." Drogo's rant vowing to give his unborn son the Iron Throne led to compliments about Jason Momoa's intensity and Emilia Clarke's calm and loving facial expressions.

However, the scene where Littlefinger exposes his motivations while hiring two whores for his brothel was largely criticized as an example of the show's perceived abuse of conversations with prostitutes as an expository device, a situation for which Myles McNutt coined the term "sexposition." Aidan Gillen's acting was consistently praised and the comparison between Littlefinger's actions and faking an orgasm was considered apt, but many agreed with Meslow's statement that it was "annoyingly overshadowed by the series' most gratuitous sex scene to date." Among other criticisms were the scene's excessive length, the repetition of the dramatic approach, and the assumption that viewers were not going to pay attention when presented with a long exposition that did not include sex.

References

External links 

 "You Win or You Die" at HBO
 

2011 American television episodes
Game of Thrones (season 1) episodes
Mariticide in fiction
Fiction about regicide
Television episodes written by David Benioff and D. B. Weiss